Marie-Christine Cazier-Ballo (born 23 August 1963 in Paris) is a retired French sprinter, who specialized in the 200 meters. She set three French records over the distance, the last being 22.32 seconds, when she won a silver medal at the 1986 European Championships. She competed in the women's 200 metres at the 1988 Summer Olympics.

Achievements

References

External links

1963 births
Living people
French female sprinters
Athletes from Paris
European Athletics Championships medalists
Athletes (track and field) at the 1988 Summer Olympics
Olympic athletes of France
Mediterranean Games gold medalists for France
Mediterranean Games medalists in athletics
Athletes (track and field) at the 1983 Mediterranean Games
World Athletics Indoor Championships medalists
20th-century French women
21st-century French women